CooperationWorks! is a network of organizations promoting rural development through the formation of cooperatives in the United States.  CooperationWorks! is organized as a cooperative of 21 member development centers. The co-op facilitates the coordination of cooperative development efforts and provides business expertise to its member organizations.

CooperationWorks! is partnered with the National Cooperative Business Association and the Cooperative Development Foundation.

History
Legislation was signed into law in 1990 authorizing grants to establish a network of rural cooperative development centers throughout the United States.  The development centers worked together on an informal basis for nine years. The Madison Principles, a set of standards for cooperative development, were developed in 1995 in Madison, Wisconsin. In February 1999, representatives from nine cooperative development centers on the U.S. met in Denver to found CooperationWorks!

In September 2009, the USDA awarded $2.9 million in grants to 15 members of CooperationWorks! to create jobs and foster economic development in rural communities.

Members
 Arkansas Rural Enterprise Center
 California Center for Cooperative Development
 Common Enterprise Development Corporation
 Cooperative Development Institute
 Cooperative Development Services
 Democracy Collaborative
 Food Cooperative Initiative
 Fund for Democratic Communities
 Indiana Cooperative Development Center
 Iowa Alliance for Cooperative Business Development
 Kentucky Center for Agriculture and Rural Development
 Keystone Development Center
 Latino Economic Development Center
 Mississippi Center for Cooperative Development
 Montana Cooperative Development Center
 North American Students of Cooperation
 National Cooperative Development Association
 National Network of Forest Practitioners
 Nebraska Cooperative Development Center
 North Dakota Rural Electric and Telecommunications Development Center
 Northwest Cooperative Development Center
 Ohio Cooperative Development Center
 Rocky Mountain Farmers Union Cooperative and Economic Development Center
 South Dakota Value Added Agriculture Development Center

References

External links
 Official website

Agricultural cooperatives in the United States
Agricultural organizations based in the United States